José Adonis Lavaire is Honduras's Minister of Industry and Commerce.

References

Living people
Government ministers of Honduras
Year of birth missing (living people)